The Cameroon national badminton team represents Cameroon in international team competitions. It is controlled by the Badminton Federation of Cameroon, the governing body for Cameroonian badminton which is located in Yaoundé. The Cameroonian men's team reached the quarterfinals of the 2018 All Africa Men's and Women's Team Badminton Championships, which is their best result to date.

The mixed team competed for the first time in the 2014 African Badminton Championships. The team was eliminated in the group stage. The women's team have yet to compete in any international team tournament.

Participation in BCA competitions 

Men's team

Mixed team

Current squad 

Men
Michel Henri Assembe
Gilles Francis Donguitsop
Félix Michel Kemene Atangana
Antoine Eddy Owona Ndimako

Women
Bibiane Ewane Ngobi
Lisane Mbas Louise
Manuela Abena
Nswani Cookey

References 

Badminton
National badminton teams
Badminton in Cameroon